Inge Marie Krogh (13 November 1920 – 6 February 2023) was a Danish physician and politician. A member of the Christian People's Party, she served in the Folketing from 1973 to 1984.

Krogh died in Horsens on 6 February 2023, at the age of 102.

References

1920 births
2023 deaths
Danish centenarians
Women centenarians
Members of the Folketing 1973–1975
Members of the Folketing 1975–1977
Members of the Folketing 1977–1979
Members of the Folketing 1979–1981
Members of the Folketing 1981–1984
Christian Democrats (Denmark) politicians
University of Copenhagen alumni
People from Odense
Women members of the Folketing